Seekirchen am Wallersee (simply known as Seekirchen) is a town in the district of Salzburg-Umgebung in the state of Salzburg in Austria.

History
The territory was settled 5,000 years ago and is the oldest Austrian settlement that still exists today. Today it has more than 10,000 inhabitants (from that point its officially called a "city").

Geography
Seekirchen is part of the legal district Neumarkt bei Salzburg. It borders on the neighboring towns of Anthering, Elixhausen, Eugendorf, Hallwang, Henndorf am Wallersee, Köstendorf, Mattsee, Obertrum am See and Schleedorf.

The Austrian land register subdivides Seekirchen into districts, some of which are cadastral municipalities:

Transportation
The city is 15 km distanced from Salzburg and is served by a railway line (2nd station "Seekirchen-Süd" planned in 2030) also included in the Salzburg S-Bahn

See also
 Wallersee
 Salzburgerland

Sons and daughters

 Andreas Ibertsberger (born 1982), football player
 Thomas Winklhofer (born 1970), football  player and UEFA Cup finalist

Connected to the town
 Robert Ibertsberger (born 1977 in Neumarkt), football  player; grew up in Seekirchen 
 Manfred Pamminger (born 1977 in Salzburg), footballer; grew up in Seekirchen

References

External links 

Cities and towns in Salzburg-Umgebung District